"The Fake Sound of Progress" is the second single from rock band Lostprophets' debut album The Fake Sound of Progress  and received less attention than the band's debut single, "Shinobi vs. Dragon Ninja."

Music Video
The music video was filmed in Las Vegas, Nevada. The video opens with the band being brought in to play a private concert after the persistence of their manager until the camera pans around the restaurant, showing each of the band members in disgust with the people in their audience. As the song progresses, Watkins ignores the tables in front of the stage and opens the front doors, allowing a large number of their fans to rush into the restaurant.

Track listing

Personnel
 Ian Watkins – lead vocals
 Lee Gaze – lead guitar
 Mike Lewis – rhythm guitar
 Stuart Richardson – bass guitar
 Mike Chiplin – drums, percussion
 Jamie Oliver – synth, turntables, samples

Chart positions

References

External links
www.lostprophets.com

Lostprophets songs
2002 singles
2000 songs